Marco Antonio Zimara (c. 1460–1532 CE), was an Italian philosopher.

Life
He was born in Galatina (Lecce) and from 1497 studied philosophy at the University of Padua under Agostino Nifo and Pietro Pomponazzi. He subsequently taught logic while studying medicine at Padua (1501–1505), and in 1509 was appointed professor of natural philosophy. From 1509 to 1518 Zimara lived in San Pietro in Galatina, after which he taught in Salerno (1518–1522), Naples (1522–1523), and again at Padua (1525–1528).

Zimara edited works by medieval philosophers (notably Albertus Magnus) and edited and wrote commentaries on Aristotle and Averroës. His Tabula dilucidationum in dictis Aristotelis et Averrois (1537), became the principal scholarly tool for searching the works of Aristotle and Averroës.

External links
 The date of publication of an edition of Aristotle by  Marcantonio Zimara
 Marcus Antonius Zimaras Sanctipertia's Problems.

1460 births
16th-century deaths
Italian philosophers
16th-century philosophers
Italian logicians
Natural philosophers